The Honda Z series or Monkey Bike was a line of minibikes made by Honda which have a model number starting with the letter Z. The bike came to be known as a monkey bike because most people looked large in relation to the very small motorcycle: onlookers described riders as looking like a monkey on the diminutive minibike.

Background 
The original model of the Honda Z-series was a prototype called the Honda Z100 and it was originally produced as a children's ride at a Japanese amusement park called Tama Tech. It was eventually refined and put into mass production, hitting the European market in 1964.

Design
Most Z-series bikes are small, light, collapsible motorcycles made for convenience and ease of transportation. They have  four-stroke engines with an overhead cam. Some have a centrifugal clutch and a standard three-speed manual foot-shift lever, making it a semi-automatic transmission, while others have a conventional manual clutch and a three- or four-speed gearbox.

History 
Monkey bike is the name given by Honda to one of their small, low-powered motorcycles introduced in the 1960s. The first Honda Monkey was the 1961 Z100. Later Monkeys were designated Z50, such as the Z50A(US), J, M, R(US) and Z.

The first Monkey bikes did not have any suspension, but front suspension was soon added. By 1974, when the Z50J was introduced (US 1972 Z50AK3), suspension had been added to the rear, as well. The first Monkey bikes had  wheels, but later models had  wheels.

The early Z series Mini Trails are still highly popular, decades after the end of production, often selling for several times their original price.  Refurbishment and upgrade parts are available from a variety of sources and vendors. 

The low power of the 49cc engine used in the Mini Trail and Super Cub has resulted in numerous upgrade possibilities, including replacement with larger and newer Honda horizontal engines.

End of production
In March of 2017, Honda Motorcycle president Chiaki Kato announced that the Z50 series would be discontinued in August 2017, due to new and pending emission-control regulations in Japan, which would be very difficult for small-displacement engines to meet. The model would be retired with the release of a limited-run 50th Anniversary Special Edition, which was only available to Japanese consumers.  An online lottery, open from July 21 to August 21, was used to select buyers of the 500 units, which sold for ¥432,000 (about $3,900) including consumption tax. This final model of the Z50 mixed aspects of the Z50A (1968) and the Z50AK3 (1972) with a plaid-covered seat duplicating the original Z50M and most parts were chrome plated.

Similar and derivative designs

Numerous similar small motorcycles predate the Honda model, notably the World War II Welbike motorcycle used by parachutists, and limited numbers of minibikes powered by a repurposed lawnmower and chainsaw engines were produced in the 1950s and 1960s. This type of design did not become commonplace or popular until the introduction of the mass-produced Z series.

The Honda Dax model (the ST series in the North American market) is not a Monkey, but rather a bigger, two-seat variant, with larger  wheels and on some markets also a larger 70 cc (72) engine, instead of 50 cc (49 cc) as the Z50. The name Dax phonetically resembles Dachs, the german word for badger. The Dax models have a monocoque stamped sheet-metal frame, similar to some other early Honda motorcycles. This also houses the fuel tank, battery, and wiring loom.

While Honda has ended production of the Z50, there are several similar trail bikes being produced in China; some are parts-compatible with original Hondas.

In 2018, Honda introduced the Honda “Monkey 125” (as the 2019 model year). While actually based on the Honda Grom, the model name, styling, and paint scheme are directly inspired by the early Z series.

See also
 List of scooter manufacturers
 Pit bike
 Types of motorcycles

References

Z series
Minibikes
Motorcycles introduced in 1964